Dartree is a barony in County Monaghan, Republic of Ireland.

Etymology
Dartree is known in Irish as Dartraí from the ancient kingdom Dartraighe, named after the n-Dartraighi or Dairtre people.

Location

Dartree is found in west County Monaghan.

Dartree barony is bordered to the northeast by Monaghan; to the southeast by Cremorne (both the preceding are also in County Monaghan); to the west by Clankelly, County Fermanagh; and to the south by Tullygarvey, County Cavan.

List of settlements

Below is a list of settlements in Dartree barony:
Clones
Newbliss
Rockcorry
Scotshouse

References